Setzler Field is a 4,000 seat stadium located on the campus of Newberry College in Newberry, South Carolina. It is the oldest college stadium still in use in South Carolina.  

The stadium hosts the football team for the college.

External links
 Newberry Athletic Facilities
 Newberry College - Campus

Soccer venues in South Carolina
College football venues
Newberry, South Carolina
Newberry Wolves football
Buildings and structures in Newberry County, South Carolina